Breeze Lake is a lake in Yosemite National Park, United States.

Breeze Lake was named for William F. Breeze for his assistance in creating a map of the area.

See also
List of lakes in California

References

Lakes of Madera County, California
Lakes of Yosemite National Park
Lakes of California